Stan Barrett (born June 26, 1943) is a Hollywood stuntman, stunt coordinator actor, and former stock car racing driver. His biggest act was however outside the movie world. On December 17, 1979, he attempted to break the land speed record, and the sound barrier in the Budweiser Rocket rocket-powered three-wheel vehicle. His calculated speed was 739.666 miles per hour, (Mach 1.01), which would have made Barrett the first man to break the sound barrier in a land vehicle. The attempt was surrounded by controversy and the speed was never officially recorded. Barrett also raced in 19 Winston Cup Series races between 1980 and 1990, posting two top ten finishes.

Land speed record

In an effort led by Hal Needham, another Hollywood stuntman, and sponsored by Budweiser, the Budweiser Rocket was built with the intention of being the first land vehicle to break the sound barrier. The 3-wheeler was powered by a hybrid liquid and solid-fuel rocket engine. The solid fuel booster engine came from a Sidewinder missile.

At Rogers Dry Lake on Edwards Air Force Base, the vehicle, driven by Barrett, made on December 17, 1979, an attempt to break the sound barrier. The claimed speed of 739.666 mph, equalling Mach 1.01, was never officially recorded.

NASCAR
The publicity gained from the attempt took Barrett to NASCAR. Between his movie commitments, Barrett found time to race in 19 Winston Cup Series races during the 1980s. Barrett posted two top ten finishes, running his last race in 1990. In 1999, Barrett was scheduled to run three Craftsman Truck Series races for PBH Motorsports, who had planned to field a Cup team for his son Stanton Barrett. Stan was scheduled to run at Heartland Park Topeka Watkins Glen International and Sears Point Raceway.

In 2008, at age 65, he made a surprising return to stock car racing. His son Stanton, running Chevrolets in the second tier Nationwide Series, invited Stan to run beside him in the SBM Motorsports team. After an abortive attempt at Mexico City, Stan later qualified for the Montreal and WGI races. He was forced to retire in both of them.

Stuntman career
He has worked as a stuntman since the 1960s in motion pictures and television series. He has been stunt doubling and stunt coordinating for many of Hollywood actors in films such as When Time Ran Out... and Smokey and the Bandit. He also appeared in the 1980 TV movie Stunts Unlimited about stunt performers.

Family
His son David Barrett is a prolific  Hollywood director and stunt coordinator/director. Son Stanton Barrett is also a Hollywood stuntman, and also a racing driver. He is the godson of Paul Newman, and the grandson of Dave McCoy and Roma McCoy, the founders of Mammoth Mountain Ski Area.

Motorsports career results

NASCAR
(key) (Bold – Pole position awarded by qualifying time. Italics – Pole position earned by points standings or practice time. * – Most laps led.)

Winston Cup Series

Daytona 500

Nationwide Series

References

External links
 
 
 
 Stanton Barrett Hires His Dad Stan Barrett to Drive This Weekend
 Barrett's Father Won't Qualify in Mexico City

1943 births
American stunt performers
Land speed record people
Living people
NASCAR drivers
Hendrick Motorsports drivers